Le Pinacle may refer to:

 Le Pinacle, Coaticook, Quebec, Canada
 Le Pinacle, Frelighsburg, Quebec, Canada
 Le Pinacle in Jersey, Europe

See also
 Pinnacle (disambiguation)